This list of actors with Academy Award nominations includes all male and female actors with Academy Award nominations for lead and supporting roles in motion pictures, and the total nominations and wins for each actor. Nominations in non-acting categories, such as for producing, directing or writing, are not included.

The most recent winners of all four acting categories, as of the 95th Academy Awards are  Brendan Fraser for The Whale, Michelle Yeoh, Ke Huy Quan and Jamie Lee Curtis for Everything Everywhere All at Once.

The award information is available on the Academy Awards website via dynamically-generated lists for specific actors, and for each year's nominees and winners via a scrolling timeline of all ceremonies.

Statistics

A total of 970 actors appear in the list—490 males and 480 females. Non-winning nominees include 336 males and 326 females—a total of 662. Actors that have won at least once include 155 males and 155 females—a total of 310. Only 44 actors—23 males and 21 females—are multiple Academy Award winners.

Katharine Hepburn won four times from twelve nominations—all for lead roles—making her the actor with the most wins in Academy Awards history. Daniel Day-Lewis has won three times from six lead actor nominations—the most wins for any male in the lead actor category.

Meryl Streep is the most-nominated actor of all with twenty one nominations. Jack Nicholson has received the most Academy Award nominations for any male actor with twelve nominations. Both actors have had three wins which included two for lead roles and one for a supporting role. Additionally, Ingrid Bergman, Daniel Day-Lewis,Walter Brennan, and Frances McDormand each won three awards with Bergman earning two statues from her lead roles and one from her supporting roles (out of seven total nominations) Brennan earning three (from four nominations), all in the supporting actor category, Day-Lewis earning three for his lead roles (out of six nominations) and McDormand earning three from her lead roles (out of six nominationsthree lead and three supporting).

Table key
§a winning actor who refused an award

An italicized First or Last year indicates the listed film's year of release when it is the first or most recent nomination of an actor with multiple nominations, otherwise the film year is provided after the film title in parentheses.

List of actors
The list is designed to be sortable by clicking on any of the column headings; however, sorting is only possible if JavaScript is enabled in your web browser. If viewing on a mobile device, switch to the desktop view to enable sorting by clicking on the word Desktop at the bottom of the page. The initial sort order is by actor surnames.

See also

Notes

Actors with multiple nominations at a single ceremony:

Additional winning roles:

Other:

References

Bibliography

External links

 Oscars.org - official Academy Awards site

Academy Awards
Academy Awards
Academy Awards
Academy Awards